Djavan da Silva Ferreira (born 31 December 1987), known simply as Djavan, is a Brazilian professional footballer who plays as a left back for Real Noroeste.

Club career
Born in Serrinha, Bahia, Djavan only played lower league football in his country, starting out at Feirense Futebol Clube in 2012. On 11 July 2013, he was loaned by Sport Club Corinthians Alagoano to Portuguese Primeira Liga club Académica de Coimbra. He made his debut in the competition on 18 August, starting in a 2–0 away loss against Gil Vicente FC.

On 7 June 2014, fellow league side S.L. Benfica signed Djavan to a four-year deal. On 2 August, without having played any competitive games, he moved to S.C. Braga for four years on a €1 million transfer fee. He first appeared in the league on 13 September, featuring the full 90 minutes in a 1–0 defeat at F.C. Arouca. During his first season he battled for position with Tiago Gomes, ending with 23 official matches.

On 1 June 2015, in the final of the Taça de Portugal, Djavan won a penalty after an irregular tackle from Cédric Soares, which was converted by Eder for the first goal of the game, but Braga eventually lost to Sporting CP in a penalty shootout after a 2–2 draw in regular time.

Honours
Braga
Taça de Portugal: 2015–16

References

External links

1987 births
Living people
Sportspeople from Bahia
Brazilian footballers
Association football defenders
Campeonato Brasileiro Série C players
Campeonato Brasileiro Série D players
Sport Club Corinthians Alagoano players
Clube de Regatas Brasil players
Primeira Liga players
Liga Portugal 2 players
Associação Académica de Coimbra – O.A.F. players
S.L. Benfica footballers
S.C. Braga players
S.C. Braga B players
G.D. Chaves players
Moreirense F.C. players
Brazilian expatriate footballers
Expatriate footballers in Portugal
Brazilian expatriate sportspeople in Portugal